The 2014 Season was FC Goa's first season in existence. The club competed in the inaugural edition of the Indian Super League finishing the regular season in second place and reaching the semi-finals of the play-offs.

Background
In early 2014, it was announced that the All India Football Federation, the national federation for football in India, and IMG-Reliance would be accepting bids for ownership of eight of nine selected cities for the upcoming Indian Super League, an eight-team franchise league modeled along the lines of the Indian Premier League and Major League Soccer in the United States. On 13 April 2014, it was announced that Venugopal Dhoot had won the bidding for the Goa franchise along with Dattaraj Salgaocar and Shrinivas Dempo. On 23 September 2014 Virat Kohli Indian Cricketer was unveiled as one of the co-owners. The brand ambassador of the club is Bollywood actor Varun Dhawan.
FC Goa is the first Indian sports club to launch a satellite TV Channel – FC Goa TV on Videocon D2H. On 20 September 2014 FC Goa officially confirmed Arsenal legend Robert Pires as their marquee player.

Season summary
FC Goa lost four out of their first six matches but came back strongly in the second half of the tournament with five victories from their last eight encounters keeping five clean sheets in their 14 matches. Overall, Zico has done a remarkable job with six wins, four defeats and three draws, which took them to the second spot of the standings with 22 points.

Match 1 lost to Chennayin FC 2–1 at home Balwant Singh (32') and Elano Blumer (42') gave the southerners a two-goal cushion in the first half, while Gregory Arnolin (65') managed to pull one back for the Goan franchise.

Match 2 drew to NorthEast United FC away Gregory Arnolin scored his second goal in as many matches to put FC Goa in an advantageous position only for the referee to award a controversial penalty which saw Koke convert from the spot to equalize in the first half for NorthEast United.

Match 3 lost to A de Kolkata 2–1 at home Andre Santos had put FC Goa ahead in the first half before Cavin Lobo struck twice in the second session for the Kolkata outfit.

Match 4 lost to Pune City FC 2–0 away A goal each from Kostas Katsouranis and David Trezeguet aided FC Pune City in their 2–0 victory over FC Goa.

Match 5 defeated Delhi Dynamos 2–1 away Tolgay Ozbey and Jewel Raja came to FC Goa’s rescue as they scored twice in the second half to help their side down Delhi Dynamos 2–1 after trailing by a Mads Junker goal for most of the game.

Match 6 lost to Kerala Blasters 1–0 away Milagres Gonsalves and Andrew Barisic combined brilliantly to give Kerala a win in their maiden home game with the former scoring the all-important goal in the 63rd minute.

Match 7 drew goalless to Mumbai at home Both sides created chances but failed to get off the mark as Mumbai moved up the table to fourth with the point.

Match 8 defeated Delhi Dynamos 4–1 away A brace by Youness Bengelloun, a Robert Pires spot-kick and a top strike by Tolgay Ozbey were enough to seal their first three points on the road. Gustavo Marmentini did pull one back for the home side after a penalty was awarded in the 73rd minute.

Match 9 drew goalless to Mumbai away Yet another goalless draw between the teams, this time in Mumbai. May be we might get a result between the two in the second edition of the tournament.

Match 10 defeated Pune City FC 2–0 home. FC Goa took the lead early in the fifth minute through Romeo Fernandes and sealed the victory in injury time courtesy substitute Miroslav Slepicka.

Match 11 beat Kerala Blasters 3–0 at home Zico’s side avenged their away defeat as they trounced their opponents with a brace by Miroslav Slepicka while Andre Santos added the icing on the cake. All goals came in the second period.

Match 12 beat NorthEast United 3–0 at home Romeo Fernandes and Miroslav Slepicka put ahead FC Goa ahead in the first half while Andre Santos sealed three points after change of ends.

Match 13 defeated Channaiyin FC 3–1 away The hosts were handed their first defeat of the campaign of home soil by in-form FC Goa who scored again through ‘The Three Musketeers’ Romeo Fernandes, Andre Santos and Miroslav Slepicka. Jean-Eudes Maurice did pull one back for Chennaiyin Fc in stoppage time.

Match 14 drew 1–1 to A de Kolkata away The Kolkata giants could have been knocked out of the tournament if Edgar Marcelino’s wonder strike in the 27th minute would have remained. But, Atletico de Kolkata relied on little help from match referee B Toledo as Fikru equalized through the controversial penalty at the cost of Bruno Pinheiro’s sending off.

Signings

Foreign signings

Drafted domestic players

Drafted foreign players

Players and staff

Squad

Coaching staff

Indian Super League

Regular season

League table

Results summary

Results by round

Matches

Indian Super League finals

Squad statistics

Appearances and goals

|-
|}

Goal scorers

Disciplinary record

See also
 FC Goa
 2014 Indian Super League season

References

Goa
FC Goa seasons